State Route 206 (SR 206) was a  route that served as a connection between U.S. Highway 82 and State Route 14 in the western portion of Prattville in Autauga County.

Route description
The western terminus of SR 206 was located at its intersection with US 82 in western Prattville. From this point, the route traveled in an easterly direction as West 4th Street before it took a turn to the south at South Washington Street in downtown Prattville. From this point its eastern terminus was located two blocks to the south at its intersection with SR 14. SR 206 was decommissioned in February 2013.

Major intersections

References

External links

Alabama 206 Endings

206
Transportation in Autauga County, Alabama